Frederick Maxmilian Boensch (September 27, 1920 – April 20, 2000) was an American football guard in the National Football League for the Washington Redskins.  He played college football at the University of California, Berkeley and Stanford University and was drafted in the ninth round of the 1944 NFL Draft by the Cleveland Rams.

References

1920 births
2000 deaths
American football offensive guards
California Golden Bears football players
Stanford Cardinal football players
Washington Redskins players
Players of American football from Portland, Oregon